Sikhye (식혜, also spelled shikhye or shikeh; also occasionally termed dansul or gamju) is a traditional sweet Korean rice beverage, usually served as a dessert. In addition to its liquid ingredients, Sikhye contains grains of cooked rice and in some cases pine nuts. It is similar to the Chinese jiuniang and Japanese amazake.

It is also a popular beverage in South Korea, often found in the beverage sections of convenience stores.

Preparations
Sikhye is made by pouring malt water onto cooked rice. The malt water steeps in the rice at typically 62 degrees Celsius until grains of rice appear on the surface. The liquid is then carefully poured out, leaving the rougher parts, and boiled until it gets sweet enough (no sugar is added to this drink).

In South Korea and in overseas Korean grocery stores, sikhye is readily available in cans or plastic bottles.  One of the largest South Korean producers of sikhye is the Vilac company of Busan. Most canned sikhye typically have a residue of cooked rice at the bottom. Homemade sikhye is often served after a meal in a Korean restaurant.

Regional variations
There are several regional variations of sikhye.  These include Andong sikhye and yeonyeop sikhye or yeonyeopju, a variety of sikhye made in Gangwon province. Andong sikhye differs in that it includes radishes, carrots, and powdered red pepper. Also, it is fermented for several days as opposed to being boiled. The crunchy texture of the radish is kept despite the longer fermentation process; a soft texture would indicate an inferior product. Whereas the sweet canned or restaurant sikhye is enjoyed as a dessert beverage, Andong sikhye is appreciated as a digestive aid, containing lactobacillus.

Names
Sikhye is also referred to by the names dansul (단술) and gamju (감주; 甘酒). Both of these names mean "sweet wine." However, they are also used to refer to a different, slightly alcoholic rice drink called gamju.

Hobak-sikhye
Hobak-sikhye (pumpkin sikhye) is a water-boiled broth with pumpkin, steamed rice, and malt. It is fermented for several days at a proper temperature. Some sugar is added to taste sweet.

Andong sikhye
It is original sikhye in Andong, South Korea. It is a little bit different from other Sikhyes. This Sikhye's color is light red with red pepper added.

Yeonyeop-sikhye 
Yeonyeop-sikhye is made by wrapping the hot glutinous rice, sake, and honey in a lotus leaf. Before drinking, put up a few pieces of pine nuts.

Effects
Sikhye is believed to aid digestion, it contains dietary fiber and anti-oxidants. It was regularly served to royalty after meals to help digestion.

Sikhye is said to help people who have a "cold" constitution to be warm and also helps those who have too "warm" constitution to be less warm. It is also believed to be very helpful for relieving hangovers.

Origin of the word
Sikhye is a word that does not exist in China or Japan, but rather a Korean word similar to "shikhye" with similar pronunciation and meaning. Sik(or Sak) is related with mature and Hye is making alcohol or sweet juice. These two words were combined to form. However, there is not yet a solid literary basis for etymology.

How to cook
The barley was soaked in water to wait for the buds to come out, then ground out the sun-dried malt and filtered through the water with a fine sieve, then heated up the steamed rice from the Siru and fermented.

Sikhye can also be made from a pressure cooker in the home. Dried rice, about a third of the amount, is filtered out with hot water for 20 to 30 minutes and then poured into the rice cooker three-quarters of the time. Stir with a spoon to let the rice out. Then cover and press the hold switch. If the cooking switch is pressed to make it boil, it will not be beneficial to eat, since the amylase enzyme in the malt will lose its function of decomposition.

After a few hours of keeping warm, the starch in the rice breaks down and leaves only a shell, so it's complete With the lid open, press the cook button and simmer for a few minutes, and the smell of the malt disappears. The finished Sikhye is not very sweet, so you have to adjust the sweetness by adding sugar. If you pour a low amount of malt into the Godu rice and make it high in concentration, it will taste quite sweet, but the amount of Sikhye is very small.

Sikhye products sold on the market are flavored with sugar, and are only served with broken rice grass, which is far from the original Sikhye. Sikhye's unique taste stems from the malt.

Contents
Drinking a bowl of sweet and cool Sikhye after a hearty meal during holidays and feasts is good for dessert and is helpful for digestion. Sikhye is simple in materials and easy to make, but it takes a lot of time.

If rice is made thick with rice or glutinous rice and is dissolved in pot malt and left warm overnight, the rice grains will cool and float upward. As rice is cooled by the action of the sugary enzyme contained in malt, the unique sweetness and aroma of malt are created. When the rice cools down, add sugar or honey, boil it once, cool it down, and eat it cold. Add ginger minced or citron juice when it is boiling, which makes the flavor and taste even better. When serving Sikhye, it is better served with rice, which was served separately, and other grains such as pine nuts, jujubes, or red pomegranates can be served in a proper way.

Sikhye looks more delicious when served in a neat bowl. Also, the color of the soup and rice grains is important. If rice grains start to pop up when it is washed, you should remove them with a net or a dish, rinse them in cold water, keep them cold, and put a spoonful of Sikhye water in the top. The more rice grains, the more tender the sweet and white the color. Of course, the malt must be clean and the malt must be taken out and used according to the top. When the sediment is added, the rice ball becomes dark. 

A clear broth is not necessarily a good To make Sikhye delicious, the malt must be better than anything else, and the temperature and time of cleansing are important. Drain the well-grown malt and mix it with water and use the top water. It is used widely in Korea, and it is used in Sikhye, Gochujang, rice cake, and alcohol.

Now, if you put the rice balls in the thermos and let them sit for six to seven hours, they will get enough of it, so you can do it very easily. In the past, many things were needed, such as wrapping a blanket in a hot room. The rice ball must be maintained at 50 to 60°C to be allowed to cool. If left for longer periods at a lower temperature, it will rest before it is removed, and if it is too high, the enzyme will stop working and not at all.

Gallery

See also

Gamju
Korean cuisine
Korean tea
Plant milk
Rice milk
Sujeonggwa
Sungnyung
Vilac

References

External links

Picture
Naver Encyclopedia article, in Korean
Netcooks recipe
Lifeinkorea recipe

Fermented drinks
Korean drinks
Rice drinks
Andong
Korean cuisine